Desoddharakulu is a 1973 Indian Telugu-language drama film, produced by U. Viswaswara Rao under the Deepthi International banner and directed by C. S. Rao. It stars N. T. Rama Rao and Vanisri, with music composed by K. V. Mahadevan. A Superhit at the box office, the film was the second highest grossing Telugu film of 1973 after Devudu Chesina Manushulu.

Plot
The film begins with Sri Varada Sri Krishna Yachendra, Zamindar of Mangalapuram. According to his will, his house is given to his Diwanji and all his immovable assets to charity organizations and jewelry to the temple and hands over the running of trust to Diwanji. Bhadrachalam temple trustee Dharma Rao, while taking the jewelry, met with an accident and jewelry disappears. Twenty years roll by, Prabhakar Rao, who was an inspector at the time of the crime, is now police commissioner. Diwan Raja Bhushnam becomes a big industrialist and jeep driver Tata Rao as his general manager. Trustee Dharma Rao has two sons, Raja Rao and Gopal Rao. Gopal Rao mysteriously meets Radha, daughter of Prabhakar Rao and they fall in love. Elders also agree for their marriage. Once in a party arranged by Praja Bhandhu Rajabhushnam, Raja Rao behaves against Raja Bhushnam and he is sent to jail. Gopal Rao wants to find out the reason for the injustice done to his brother Raja Rao. He meets Raja Bhushnam and he says that his father had stolen jewelry belonging to the temple and committed suicide. To know the truth, Gopal Rao goes to the commissioner. The rest of the story is how Gopal Rao catches the real culprits and proves his father's innocence.

Cast
N. T. Rama Rao as Gopal Rao
Vanisri as Radha
Nagabhushanam as Raja Bhushnam 
Satyanarayana
Allu Ramalingaiah as Ganapathi 
Padmanabham
Prabhakar Reddy as Commissioner Prabhakar Rao
Mikkilineni as Raja Rao 
Dhulipala 
Rajanala as Tata Rao 
Mukkamala 
Tyagaraju
Savitri
Raja Sulochana 
Shubha
C.H. Narayana Rao as Inspector General of Police
Nagayya
Padma Khanna as Roja
Chalapathi Rao
Rao Gopal Rao

Soundtrack

Music composed by K. V. Mahadevan.

References

1970s Telugu-language films
Indian drama films
Films directed by C. S. Rao
Films scored by K. V. Mahadevan